Latika Kumari (born 5 January 1992) is an Indian cricketer. She is a right-handed batter and her bowling style is right-arm medium. She is a part of major teams like Delhi Women, India B Women, India Blue Women, and India Women. Kumari made her T20I debut in England Women v. India Women at Taunton on 11 June 2009. Her last T20I was India Women v. New Zealand Women at Bengaluru on 15 July 2015. 

In 2009, Kumari was included in the squad of fifteen along with two new inclusions: Babita Mandlik and offspinner Diana David.

References

1992 births
Living people
Indian women cricketers
India women Twenty20 International cricketers
Delhi women cricketers
Place of birth missing (living people)